Charomskoye is a rural locality (a selo) and the administrative center of Sizemskoye Rural Settlement, Sheksninsky District, Vologda Oblast, Russia. The population was 579 as of 2002. There are 9 streets.

Geography 
Charomskoye is located 21 km north of Sheksna (the district's administrative centre) by road. Fedotovo is the nearest rural locality.

References 

Rural localities in Sheksninsky District